is a 2014 Japanese romance film directed by Yakumo Saiji. The theme song is sung by Weaver.

Cast
Osamu Mukai as Noburo (Aged 30)
Akari Hayami as Momose
Tarou Takeuchi as Noboru
Anna Ishibashi as Tetsuko
Kudo Asuka as Miyazaki

References

External links
 

2014 romance films
2014 films
Japanese romance films
Films based on Japanese novels
2014 directorial debut films
2010s Japanese films